Elda Cividino (13 December 1921 – 15 July 2014) was an Italian gymnast who competed at the 1936 Summer Olympics in Berlin, where she placed seventh with her squad in a field of eight nations in the women's team all-around. Cividino was born in Trieste on 13 December 1921. She celebrated her 90th birthday in December 2011, and died in 2014.

References

1921 births
2014 deaths
Gymnasts at the 1936 Summer Olympics
Italian female artistic gymnasts
Olympic gymnasts of Italy